Kim Woo-sung (born February 25, 1993, in Wonju, South Korea), also known as Woosung and Sammy, is a Korean-American singer–songwriter and composer, best known as a vocalist and electric guitarist of South Korean band The Rose. He made his solo debut on July 25, 2019, with the extended play Wolf.

Career

Woosung grew up in the US and came to Korea after auditioning for the first season of the reality show K-pop Star. After being eliminated, he took a break from music and taught English in Korea.

He debuted on August 3, 2017, as a vocalist and electric guitarist of rock band, The Rose which consists of members Hajoon, Woosung, Dojoon, and Jaehyung. The band debuted with their single 'Sorry'''.

On March 20, 2019, it was announced on Twitter that Kim will be the third MC on After School Club, replacing Seungmin. Kim would MC along with Park Jimin and Han Hee-jun beginning with episode 361 on March 26, 2019.

Kim's pre-release single "Lonely" came out on July 19, 2019. His first extended play Wolf was released the following week on July 25, along with the single "Face". The EP peaked at number 19 on the Gaon Album Chart.

His full-length album Genre was released on December 9, 2021. He then opened for Epik High on their American tour from March 1 to April 12, 2022

His EP Moth was released on May 13, 2022. On April 15, he started his own tour in Europe, the USA, and Canada, "Moth EP Showcase", which will end on May 26 in Seoul, for a special appearance with the presence of the members of The Rose for the first time in several years.

Discography
Studio albums

Extended plays

Singles

Songwriting and composing creditsNote: all songs released by The Rose are written and composed by the band, and are thus credited as such.''

Filmography

Television

Music videos

References

1993 births
Living people
21st-century South Korean  male singers